Howard C. Bauchner, vice chairman of pediatrics at the Boston University School of Medicine, was the editor-in-chief of the Journal of the American Medical Association (JAMA) from July 1, 2011 until June 30, 2021. During his time with JAMA he created the JAMA Network family of specialty journals, launched four new journals (JAMA Oncology, JAMA Cardiology,  JAMA Network Open, JAMA Health Forum), created many new article types, established a relationship with the United States Preventive Services Task Force, and expanded the journal's digital presence through website redesign, search engine optimization of journal websites, and expanded social media and multimedia activity. He stepped down from the editor-in-chief position  in partial response to a JAMA Network podcast addressing structural racism. 

From 2003 to 2011, he served as editor-in-chief of Archives of Disease in Childhood.

References

External links
Profile — Boston University website

Boston University faculty
American pediatricians
Living people
JAMA editors
Year of birth missing (living people)
Members of the National Academy of Medicine